Fanari railway station is a small railway station in the Karditsa regional unit, Thessaly. Located with a farming community of the same name, it opened on 16 June 1886 by the Thessaly Railways (now part of OSE). Today TrainOSE operates both regional and intercity services to destinations across Greece.

History
The station open 16 June 1886 by the Thessaly Railways. The original station building (and the line) was designed by the Italian Evaristo de Chirico, (father of Giorgio de Chirico). The Greek government authorised the line under the law AMH’/22.6.1882. soon after the liberation of Central Greece from the Ottomans.

After the First World War, the Greek state planned the ambitious construction of several new rail lines and links, including a standard gauge line from Kalambaka on to Kozani and then Veroia creating a conversion of the route from Volos to Kalambaka on standard gauge. In 1927, the relevant decisions were made, starting in 1928, work was carried out on the construction of the new line from Kalambaka. But a year later, it was clear that the project would exceed the estimated costs many times over. In 1932, the construction work was stopped and remains unfinished. In 1955 Thessaly Railways was absorbed into Hellenic State Railways (SEK).

Freight traffic declined sharply when the state-imposed monopoly of OSE for transporting agricultural products and fertilizers ended in the early 1990s. Many small stations of the network with little passenger traffic were closed down, especially on the mainline section and between Karditsa and Kalampaka. In 2001 the section between Kalampaka and Palaiofarsalos was converted from Narrow-gauge (1000 mm) to standard gauge (1435 mm) and physically connected at Palaiofarsalos with the mainline from Athens to Thessaloniki. Since to upgrade; however, travel times improved and the unification of rail gauge allowed direct services, even InterCity services, to link Volos and Kalambaka with Athens and Thessaloniki.

In 2001 the infrastructure element of OSE was created, known as GAIAOSE; it would henceforth be responsible for the maintenance of stations, bridges, and other elements of the network, as well as the leasing and the sale of railway assists. In 2005, TrainOSE was created as a brand within OSE to concentrate on rail services and passenger interface. In 2009, with the Greek debt crisis unfolding OSE's Management was forced to reduce services across the network. Timetables were cut back, and routes closed as the government-run entity attempted to reduce overheads. In 2015 a 15-year-old child was airlifted to a hospital after being electrocuted at the station. In 2017 OSE's passenger transport sector was privatized as TrainOSE; currently, a wholly-owned subsidiary of Ferrovie dello Stato Italiane infrastructure, including stations, remained under the control of OSE. In July 2022, the station began being served by Hellenic Train, the rebranded TranOSE

Facilities
The Station is now a basic halt, with few facilities. There are no waiting rooms (as the station building is rundown and seemingly abandoned. The station is (as of 2020) unstaffed, with no ticket-purchasing facilities or parking.

Services 
Today, the station is served by direct lines to the rest of Greece via Palaiofarsalos, served by intercity trains to Athens,  Larissa and Thessaloniki. Previously Thessaly Railways operated a narrow gauge service to Volos.

In August 2009, TrainOSE S.A. proceeded to a drastic cutback of passenger services on Thessaly lines. As of Spring 2020, There are ten  (five in each direction) Regional express services on Palaiofarsalos-Kalambaka Line. In addition, there is one Regional express train to Athens from Kalambaka and back (884/885).

References

External links
https://www.gtp.gr/TDirectoryDetails.asp?ID=77328

Transport in Trikala (regional unit)
Railway stations in Thessaly
Railway stations opened in 1886
Buildings and structures in Trikala (regional unit)
Thessaly Railways